Mount Lukens is a mountain peak of the San Gabriel Mountains, in Los Angeles County, Southern California.

Geography
It is in the Sunland-Tujunga community within the northeast corner of the city of Los Angeles, above the Crescenta Valley. The summit's elevation makes Los Angeles the city with the largest difference between high and low points among the 50 most populous cities in the US.

Because of its location, prominence, and proximity to Los Angeles, the summit is dotted with television, radio, and cellular transmission towers. The mountain is also within the boundaries of the Angeles National Forest and Los Angeles County.

Name origin
The mountain was named after Theodore Lukens, a former supervisor of the Angeles National Forest and later, the mayor of Pasadena, California.  Previously, the mountain was known as Sister Elsie Peak. It has been said that she was a Catholic nun who died while caring for the sick during a smallpox epidemic. On the USFS map of 1925, the mountain was shown as Mount Lukens and subtitled Sister Elsie Peak. The identity of Sister Elsie (also referred to as Sister Else) is not certain and the stories surrounding her have not been verified.

2009 Station Fire
Mount Lukens is in an area that was affected by the 2009 Station Fire in the San Gabriel Mountains.

Radio communication facilities 
Mount Lukens is a radio site with buildings owned by American Tower, Crown Castle, MobileRelay Associates, among others.

This site provides excellent coverage of Los Angeles, San Fernando Valley, Orange County and parts of Riverside and San Bernardino areas. It houses both broadcast and two-way communications facilities on virtually every frequency band, including FM broadcast, VHF low- and high-band, UHF, 800/900 MHz, and microwave.

See also
San Gabriel Mountains National Monument

References

Lukens
Lukens
Angeles National Forest
Geography of Los Angeles
Geography of the San Fernando Valley
Crescenta Valley
Sunland-Tujunga, Los Angeles
Lukens